Hermann Leopold Tertsch del Valle-Lersundi (born 9 April 1958) is a Spanish journalist, lawyer and politician. He has been a member of the European Parliament for the Vox party since 2019, integrated within the European Conservatives and Reformists (ECR).

Biography 
Through his mother Felisa del Valle-Lersundi he is a cousin of Loyola de Palacio and Ana de Palacio. He was a member of the Communist Party of the Basque Country in his youth.

Based in Vienna, Tertsch became a correspondent for the Agencia EFE in 1982, covering Central and Eastern Europe. Soon after, in 1983, he began to work for the center-left newspaper El País as correspondent to Bonn. He chronicled the Yugoslav Wars, featuring a marked anti-Serbian point of view. He became a regular columnist and served for a time as the newspaper's op-ed editor. During the years he became a regular radio guest for the Cadena SER, Radio Nacional de España and Onda Cero.

He left El País in 2007, becoming a political opinion writer for the conservative newspaper ABC soon after. He was also hired by Telemadrid, and became the host of the early-morning  in 2008, replacing Fernando Sánchez Dragó. After some weeks of convalescence, as he suffered wounds in what the policial investigation termed as a "bar fight" in a piano-bar in Madrid (the Toni 2) in December 2009, he left the role of host.

In April 2019, Tertsch announced his intention to run for the 2019 European Parliament election in Spain with the Vox party. As the party won 3 seats in the election, he was elected MEP. He joined the Committee on Foreign Affairs (AFET), as well as the Delegation to the EU-Mexico Joint Parliamentary Committee (D-MX) and the Delegation to the Euro-Latin American Parliamentary Assembly (DLAT), serving as vice-chair in the later body.

After the announcement of the prospective government formation in Spain under Pedro Sánchez in January 2020 after the November 2019 general election, Terstch, just returned from Bolivia, asked for a military coup in the country to abort what he framed as an "obvious putschist process seeking the demolition of Spain as a nation".

Decorations 
 Cirilo Rodríguez Journalism Award (1989)
 Golden Cross of the Order of Merit of the Republic of Hungary (2019)
 Order of Merit of the Republic of Poland (2022)

References 
Informational notes

Citations

Living people
MEPs for Spain 2019–2024
Vox (political party) MEPs
El País op-ed editors
ABC (newspaper) people
1958 births
Politicians from Madrid
Spanish people of Austrian descent
Spanish people of German descent
Spanish people of Irish descent
Recipients of the Order of Merit of the Republic of Hungary
Spanish opinion journalists